Jacques Stephen Alexis (Gonaïves, Haiti, 22 April 1922–Casernes Dessalines, Haiti, c. 22 April 1961) was a Haitian communist novelist, poet, and activist. He is best known for his novel Compère Général Soleil (1955).

Biography
Alexis was born in Gonaïves, the son of journalist, historian and diplomat Stephen Alexis and Lydia Nonez, descendant of one of Haiti's founding fathers, Jean-Jacques Dessalines. Alexis grew up in a family in which literary and political discussions were the norm. At the age of 18, he made what was regarded as remarkable literary debut with an essay about the Haitian poet, Hamilton Garoute. He collaborated on a number of literary reviews, before founding La Ruche, a group dedicated to creating a literary and social spring in Haiti in the early 1940s. After completing medical school in Paris, he traveled throughout Europe and lived for a few years in Cuba.

In 1955, his novel Compère Général Soleil, was published by Gallimard in Paris. The novel has been translated into English as General Sun, My Brother. He followed up with Les Arbres musiciens (1957), L'Espace d'un cillement (1959), and Romancero aux étoiles (1960).

More than just an intellectual, Jacques Stephen Alexis was also an active participant in the social and political debates of his time. In 1959, he formed the People's Consensus Party (Parti pour l'Entente Nationale-PEP), a left-wing political party, but he was forced into exile by the Duvalier dictatorship. In August 1960, he attended a Moscow meeting of representatives of 81 communist parties from all over the world, and signed a common accord document called "The Declaration of the 81" in the name of Haitian communists.

In April 1961, he returned to Haiti, but soon after landing at Môle-Saint-Nicolas he was arrested. He was arrested under a fake name, although he later revealed his true identity. He had a sum of roughly $20,000 on him and it is believe by his daughter Florence that he was killed by those who arrested him because of the money. He was not taken to the town's main square and was tortured. Jacques never made it to Port-au-Prince.

He is survived by his wife Andree Roumer, niece of eminent Haitian poet Émile Roumer, his daughter Florence Alexis and his son, modern Afro-Caribbean artist Jean-Jacques Stephen Alexis (AKA: JanJak II).

See also
List of solved missing person cases

Bibliography 
 Compère Général Soleil (1955). General Sun, My Brother, trans. Carrol F. Coates (1999).
 Les Arbres musiciens (1957).
 L'Espace d'un cillement (1959). In the Flicker of an Eyelid, trans. Carrol F. Coates and Edwidge Danticat (2002).
 Romancero aux étoiles (1960).
 L'étoile Absinthe, suivi de Le léopard (2017).

Books
 Maximilien Laroche, Le Romancero aux étoiles et l'œuvre romanesque de Jacques-Stephen Alexis, 1978 Maximilien Laroche, Le réalisme merveilleux dans Les arbres musiciens de Jacques-Stéphen Alexis, GRELCA, 1987 Maximilien Laroche, Contribution à l'étude du réalisme merveilleux, Collection Essais, Québec, GRELCA. 1987  N.B. Many other books and articles of Maximilien Laroche analyse the Works of Jacques Stephen Alexis. Professor Laroche having contributed to the making better known the importance of Jacques Stephen Alexis, his students at Laval University and around the world have published many books and articles -some of which can be found at the Library of Lava l University l. [1] [archive]
 Rodriguez, Emilio Jorge, Haiti and Trans-Caribbean Literary Identity / Haití y la transcaribeñidad literaria. St. Martin: House of Nehesi Publishers, 2011.

References 

1922 births
1960s missing person cases
1961 deaths
20th-century Haitian novelists
Dessalines family
Haitian communists
Haitian expatriates in Cuba
Haitian expatriates in France
Haitian male novelists
Haitian medical writers
Haitian physicians
Missing person cases in Haiti
People from Gonaïves